1826 in archaeology.

Explorations

Excavations
 Preliminary excavations at Harappa in British India by Daya Ram Sahni.

Finds
 Possible date - Discovery of Hunterston Brooch in Scotland.

Publications

Births
 March 20 - Augustus Wollaston Franks, English antiquarian (died 1897)

Deaths

 March 10 - John Pinkerton, Scottish-born antiquarian (born 1758)

References

Archaeology
Archaeology by year
Archaeology
Archaeology